Alabas Farhat is an American politician and LGBT activist who is a member of the Michigan House of Representatives for the 3rd district. Elected in November 2022, he assumed office on January 1, 2023.

Early life and education 
Farhat was raised in Dearborn, Michigan. He earned a Bachelor of Science degree in public health from the University of Michigan–Dearborn in 2021 and will earn a Master of Public Administration from the Gerald R. Ford School of Public Policy in 2023.

Career 
Farhat has worked as an intern and field director for State Representative Abdullah Hammoud. He was also the field director for Wayne County Commissioner Sam Baydoun. He was an organizer for the Michigan Democratic Party before joining staff of the Wayne County Executive Warren Evans.

References 

Living people
People from Dearborn, Michigan
Politicians from Dearborn, Michigan
Democratic Party members of the Michigan House of Representatives
University of Michigan–Dearborn alumni
University of Michigan alumni
Gerald R. Ford School of Public Policy alumni
People from Wayne County, Michigan
Year of birth missing (living people)